Daniele Bracciali and Potito Starace were the defending champions, but they lost in the first round to Paul Hanley and Jordan Kerr.
Robert Lindstedt and Horia Tecău won the final over Jérémy Chardy and Łukasz Kubot, 7–6(7–2), 6–3.

Seeds

Draw

Draw

BRD Nastase Tiriac Trophy - Doubles
2012 Doubles